This is an incomplete list of embedded devices that run MontaVista Linux: electronic devices with limited internal computers whose main operating system is based on MontaVista's distribution of the open-source Linux operating system.

Digital televisions 
 Philips Aurea and selected ambiLight models
 Sony Bravia models from 2005 and earlier
 selected models from Samsung, Panasonic, Sharp and Mitsubishi

Digital video recorders and set-top boxes 
 Sony DHG-HDD250
 Sony DHG-HDD500

ebook readers 
 Sony LIBRIé EBR-1000
 Sony PRS-505
 Sony PRS-700
 Sony PRS-300
 Sony PRS-600
 Sony PRS-900

Voip phones 
 D-Link DPH-125MS

Mobile phones 
 Motorola A760
 Motorola A768
 Motorola A768i
 Motorola A780
 Motorola A910
 Motorola E680
 Motorola E680i
 Motorola MING
 Motorola RAZR2
 Motorola ROKR E2
 Motorola ROKR E6
 Motorola RIZR Z6
 Motorola ZN5
 NEC N900iL
 NEC N901iC
 Panasonic P901i

Musical instruments 
 Yamaha MOTIF XS music production  synthesiser, Yamaha Motif-Rack XS tone module, and Yamaha S90XS synthesizer.

Network attached storage
 Seagate Central STCG2000100
 Seagate Business Storage STBN8000200
 SMC TigerSTore SMCNAS02
 SMC TigerSTore SMCNAS04

Notebooks 
 Dell Latitude E4200
 Dell Latitude E4300
 Dell Latitude Z600

Routers 
 D-Link G604T Network Adaptor
 D-Link G624T Router
 D-Link G664T
 D-Link G684T ADSL2+/WiFi
 Linksys WAG200G ADSL2+/WiFi
 ACORP Sprinter@ADSL LAN120M

Cable modems 
 all DOCSIS/EuroDOCSIS 3.0 cable modems based on Intel Puma5 chipset

Traffic signal control 
 Peek Traffic PTC-1

Telecommmucations equipment 
 Alcatel-Lucent
 Brocade SAN switches
 Ericsson
 Fujitsu
 Iskratel SI 2000 call server
 Microsemi SyncServer
 Motorola WiMax CPE i775
 NEC
 Cisco Application Control Engine module
 Cisco Nexus switches running NX-OS
 Avaya Aura Session Border Controller (SBC)
 Cyclades ACS

Digital televisions 
 Aviosys IP Kamera 9070 series (TI Davinci DM355 board)

Other 
 Spirent Testcenter
 APC by Schneider Electric IP KVM - The AP5405 remote Internet Protocol keyboard/video/mouse controller allows 16 servers to be accessed over a TCP/IP network.
 Philips iPronto remote controller
 St. Jude Medical Merlin patient care system
 Texas Instruments announced using MontaVista Linux as the supported operating system for their system on a chip platform, Texas Instruments DaVinci. MVL4 and MVL5 were used for the first and second software development kit series until TI decided for a less commercial approach with the third edition of their software development kit.
 The terminals used for the National Lottery and EuroMillions games in the Republic of Ireland are based on MontaVista Linux and use a Java client, as do most other newer GTECH Corporation Altura terminals.
 SEGA Lindbergh hardware for arcade gaming
 Clarion NX603 multimedia head unit
 Phenom (electron microscope) (first generation - later switched to other distributions)
 British Telecom ITS.Netrix dealerboards 
 Canon imageRUNNER Advance C5051i multi-function printer (MFP) 
 Sony DVS, MVS & MVS-X Production Switchers
 Hewlett-Packard Designjet large-format printers (z3200 series)

References 

Embedded Linux